Ellwood P. Cubberley High School (1956–1979) known locally as "Cubberley", was one of three public high schools in Palo Alto, California. The site of the closed school is now named Cubberley Community Center and used as a community center and used for many diverse activities.

History 
Opened in 1956, Cubberley High was located at 4000 Middlefield Road. The high school was named after Ellwood Patterson Cubberley, the Dean of the Stanford Graduate School of Education and pioneer of educational administration.

The school was finally closed in 1979 as a reaction to declining enrollment and decreased revenues following Proposition 13. The other local high schools Gunn High School and Palo Alto High School had been created on friendly land transfers from Stanford University and if educational use was to be terminated, the land would revert to the university for the value at the time of transfer. The Palo Alto Unified School District board, requiring an infusion of cash, determined Cubberley could be sold at more contemporary rates.  Later it was discovered that it could only be sold to a non-profit organization. That has resulted in part of the campus being converted into the Cubberley Community Center, on an annual lease from the school district to the City of Palo Alto.

The Cubberley Cougars competed in the SPAL of the CIF Central Coast Section. The school won its only CCS Championship in track and field in 1979, just days before it would close forever.

Cubberley was the scene of The Third Wave (experiment) by teacher Ron Jones in 1967, which was an elaborate social experiment to better understand fascism. The experiment was later portrayed in a film and television.

A KQED (TV) special program from 1970 features a three-day teaching conference at Cubberley High School that focused on ecology and population issues.

Numerous societal tensions played out at Cubberley from 1967 to 1969 that were the subject of Sylvia Berry Williams' 1970 book Hassling, which gave the school national attention.

For many years the use of the Cubberley location has been subject to local community debate. According to local news in 2011, enrollment projections done by Palo Alto Unified School District suggested Cubberley may need to be reopened as a fourth middle school by 2015 and ultimately be reopened as a third high school by 2021. However these plans were delayed by the city, and the city and the school district have been in discussions.

Notable alumni

This is listed in order by occupation, and listed in alphabetical order by last name.

Athletics 
 Bill Green (class of 1979), Olympic sprinter
 Art Kuehn (class of 1971) Football Center
 Tom Melvin (class of 1979), NFL coach
 Tom Ritchey (class of 1974),  mountain bike pioneer and founder of Ritchey Design

Arts and entertainment 
 Donny Baldwin (class of 1969), drummer with Elvin Bishop, Jefferson Starship, Cold Blood, Jerry Garcia Band
 Michael Finney (class of 1974), ABC 7/KGO television and radio consumer reporter 
 Željko Ivanek (class of 1975), actor
 Jon Jang (class of 1972), jazz musician
 Gregg Rolie (class of 1965), musician, founding member of both Santana and Journey

Authors and journalists 
 James Gurney (class of 1976), illustrator and author
 Neil Howe (class of 1969), author
 Michio Kaku (class of 1964), theoretical physicist and author
 Wendy Lesser (class of 1969) critic, novelist, and editor

Business 
 Brendan Eich (class of 1979), creator of JavaScript, co-founder of Mozilla.

Law 
 Bruce Fein (class of 1965), constitutional law attorney.

Religion 
 Gerrit W. Gong (class of 1971), member of the Quorum of the Twelve Apostles of the Church of Jesus Christ of Latter-day Saints.

Science 
 Michio Kaku (class of 1964) Theoretical physicist, futurist, science speaker/presenter.

Notable faculty
 George Hurley, NFL offensive lineman, Cubberley football coach, taught wood shop, and driving.
 Ron Jones, author and creator of The Third Wave social experiment.

See also
List of closed secondary schools in California

References

External links
The Cubberley Closing: A Tough Call
The Cubberley Catamount

Educational institutions established in 1956
Educational institutions disestablished in 1979
Defunct schools in California
Buildings and structures in Palo Alto, California
High schools in Santa Clara County, California
1956 establishments in California
1979 disestablishments in California